Brooke Forester (7 February 1717 – 8 July 1774) was the long-serving Member of Parliament for the borough constituency of Wenlock from 1739 and 1768.  

He was the eldest son of William Forester of Dothill in Wellington, Shropshire (now Telford) and Catherine, daughter and heir of William Brooke of Clerkenwell. Forester married twice.  His first marriage was on 4 May 1734 to Elizabeth daughter and sole heiress of George Weld of Willey Park. Their only surviving son was George Forester.  

Forester's father and grandfather, as well as his brother Cecil Forester and cousin Cecil Forester, later Weld-Forester and Baron Forester, all represented Wenlock.

References

Burkes Peerage (1939 edition).

1717 births
1774 deaths
Members of the Parliament of Great Britain for English constituencies
People from Wellington, Shropshire
British MPs 1734–1741
British MPs 1741–1747
British MPs 1747–1754
British MPs 1754–1761
British MPs 1761–1768